Fresh is a 2022 American horror thriller film directed by Mimi Cave, in her directorial debut, from a screenplay by Lauryn Kahn. The film stars Daisy Edgar-Jones and Sebastian Stan. It is a co-production between Legendary Pictures and Hyperobject Industries; Adam McKay produced the film alongside Kevin J. Messick.

Fresh had its world premiere at the Sundance Film Festival on January 20, 2022, and was released on March 4, 2022, via Hulu by Searchlight Pictures in the United States and Disney+ via Star internationally, marking the first Legendary film released by Disney rather than Warner Bros. Pictures, Universal Pictures or Netflix. The film received generally positive reviews from critics.

Fresh follows Noa (Daisy Edgar-Jones), who meets the alluring Steve (Sebastian Stan) at a grocery store and - given her frustration with dating apps - takes a chance and gives him her number. After their first date, Noa is smitten and accepts Steve's invitation to a romantic weekend getaway, only to find that her new paramour has been hiding some unusual appetites.

Plot
Noa, a woman from Portland, is increasingly disillusioned with online dating and the rude men she interacts with. One day at the supermarket, a man named Steve flirts with her and they exchange numbers. On their first date, the two quickly hit it off and have sex. After several dates, Steve invites Noa for a weekend break away alone with him. Against the advice of her best friend Mollie, Noa agrees to the trip. Planning to travel early the following day, Noa spends the evening at Steve's luxury home. Steve drugs Noa's cocktail and she falls unconscious.

Noa wakes up in captivity, chained to the ground. Steve explains that he is a butcher of human meat, which he both consumes himself and sells to wealthy clients. They prefer the meat of young women, so he regularly lures and abducts women on dates. He says that he will keep Noa alive as long as possible in order to keep her meat fresh as he intends to surgically remove different pieces of her body over time. Steve allows Noa to take a shower, but she tries to escape. Steve captures her and harvests her buttocks as punishment. Noa speaks to a woman named Penny who is being held captive in an adjacent room, and Penny tells her that a woman who's singing incoherently is another victim named Melissa who has gone insane.

Meanwhile, Mollie becomes concerned about Noa's disappearance and begins investigating with her friend Paul, a bartender who served Noa and Steve drinks on their first date. After searching online, Mollie discovers Steve is actually named Brendan, and is married to a woman named Ann with whom he has children. Mollie visits Ann and informs her of Brendan’s apparent affair. Brendan arrives, but denies any knowledge of Noa when questioned by Mollie. As she leaves, Mollie calls Noa's phone, which begins ringing in Brendan's pocket. Ann, revealed to be Brendan's accomplice, knocks Mollie unconscious. It is revealed that Ann has a prosthetic leg and was one of Brendan's victims before he fell for her.

Noa gains Brendan's trust by flirting and pretending to be interested in what human meat tastes like. Brendan invites her to dinner and persuades her to taste a lavish meal containing human meat, which Noa pretends to appreciate; she later vomits in her cell. Meanwhile, Brendan takes Mollie away for harvesting. Brendan invites Noa to another dinner, providing her with a pink dress as a gift. Before dinner, Brendan shows Noa a hidden compartment filled with items belonging to his victims, indicating he has abducted and murdered dozens of women before her. Noa recognizes Mollie's phone among the stolen victims' phones in one of the compartments. He feeds Noa breast meat, which Brendan connotes as possibly tasting "familiar." Following dinner, Noa persuades Brendan to have sex with her and let her perform fellatio on him; she instead bites off his testicles. With Brendan injured, but in pursuit, Noa helps Mollie and Penny escape from their rooms. The three encounter Brendan in the kitchen and fight him, then escape into the woods with Brendan pursuing them with a gun. 

In the meantime, before she was abducted, Mollie had shared her location via phone with Paul. When he does not hear back from Mollie, Paul follows the location and arrives at Brendan's house. However, hearing gunshots fired by Brendan, Paul turns away fearing for his life. 

In the woods, Noa, Mollie, and Penny manage to attack him again, with Noa taking the gun and shooting Brendan dead. Ann arrives at the house and finds Brendan's body. She encounters Noa in the woods and tries to strangle her, but Noa stabs Ann in the neck with car keys. As Ann recovers and attempts to strangle Noa again, Mollie bludgeons Ann with a shovel. As she and Mollie relax at last, Noa receives a text from a man she went out with at the beginning of the film.

A mid-credits scene depicts five of Brendan's clients in a white room, seated at a table with bleeding human meat at the center. A Satanic symbol is displayed during the end credits, indicating that Brendan and his clients are part of a Satanist organisation.

Cast

 Daisy Edgar-Jones as Noa
 Sebastian Stan as Steve/Brendan
 Jonica T. Gibbs as Mollie
 Charlotte Le Bon as Ann
 Andrea Bang as Penny
 Dayo Okeniyi as Paul
 Brett Dier as Chad

Production
Screenwriter Lauryn Kahn, a fan of the horror genre growing up, said she wanted to write a film that would appeal to people who were horror fans and people who were not. In July 2020, it was reported Mimi Cave would direct the film in her directorial debut for Legendary Pictures, with Adam McKay producing under his Hyperobject Industries banner. To play the antagonist, Sebastian Stan sent Cave an audition video featuring himself dancing with a knife in hand. He added, "The dance sequences were a big concern for [Cave] and just in case she had any doubts that I could do it, I recorded myself in this video." Between September and December 2020, Daisy Edgar-Jones, Stan, and Jonica T. Gibbs were announced to star. Principal photography took place from February 3 to March 17, 2021, in British Columbia, Canada. Alex Somers composed the score.

Release
The film premiered online at the Sundance Film Festival on January 20, 2022. Ahead of its premiere, Searchlight Pictures acquired the film's worldwide distribution rights. An in-person premiere was held on March 3, 2022, inside Hollywood Legion Post 43 on Highland Avenue. Instead of an afterparty, the premiere had a pre-screening reception due to the film's subject matter. Gina Wade Creative created a display for the reception featuring a large table with food on it, cleavers hanging on a wall, glass jars filled with raw meat, and boxes of snacks shaped like body parts. Fresh was released on Hulu in the United States on March 4, 2022, with a Latin American premiere on Star+ and a Disney+ release in all other territories on the same date. The film was released on March 18, 2022, in the United Kingdom and Ireland, after being pushed back a few weeks.

Reception

Audience viewership 
According to Whip Media, Fresh was the second most streamed movie across all platforms, in the United States, during the week of March 4, 2022 to March 6, 2022, and the 6th during the week of March 11, 2022 to March 13, 2022. According to the streaming aggregator Reelgood, Fresh was the sixth most watched program across all platforms, during the week of March 24, 2022.

Critical reception 
 

Angela Tricarico of Business Insider found the portrayal of modern dating across the horror genre authentic and realistic while complimenting the chemistry of Daisy Edgar-Jones and Sebastian Stan. William Bibbiani of TheWrap praised the chemistry between Jones and Stan through the film, and claimed that Mimi Cave and Pawel Pogorzelski successfully manage to provide a horror movie that balances between romance and gore. Sarah-Tai Black of Los Angeles Times stated that the movie takes a fresh approach to the horror genre through its handle of horror and comedy elements, and praised the performance of Stan. Tara Brady of The Irish Times rated the film 4 out of 5 stars, complimented the performance of the cast, and reviewed positively the feminist approach of the movie across the mental trust and friendship provided between the female characters. Tomris Laffly of RogerEbert.com rated the film 3 out of 4 stars and declared that Cave and Pogorzelsk skillfully create a satirical movie through its use humor and gore, while acclaiming the performances of Jones and Stan.

Accolades

References

External links
 
 
 

2022 black comedy films
2022 comedy horror films
2022 directorial debut films
2022 horror thriller films
2020s American films
2020s comedy thriller films
2020s English-language films
American black comedy films
American comedy horror films
American comedy thriller films
American horror thriller films
Films about cannibalism
Films about cults
Films about Satanism
Films about violence against women
Films produced by Adam McKay
Films scored by Alex Somers
Films set in Portland, Oregon
Films shot in Vancouver
Hulu original films
Legendary Pictures films
Searchlight Pictures films
2022 independent films